Coal Fire, also known as Cold Fire, Coalfire, and Fundee,  is an unincorporated community in Pickens County, Alabama, United States.

History
The community was first known as Fundee, which was a portmanteau of two local family names, the Funderburks and the DeLoaches. It was then renamed for a local creek, which has been recorded as both Coal Fire and Cold Fire. A post office called Coal Fire was established in 1871, and remained in operation until being discontinued in 1927.

References

Unincorporated communities in Pickens County, Alabama
Unincorporated communities in Alabama